RAF Mona  is a Royal Air Force station near Bodffordd on the island of Anglesey, Wales. It is primarily used as a relief landing ground for RAF Valley.

RAF Mona is also the home of Mona Flying Club who operate some evenings and most weekends.

History

First World War

This location was first used for aviation during the First World War when the Royal Naval Air Service opened an airship base here named Royal Naval Air Station (RNAS) Anglesey (also known as RNAS Bodffordd, RNAS Gwalchmai and RNAS Llangefni).

RNAS Anglesey was commissioned on 26 September 1915, when it was operated by 14 Group RNAS, operating SS18, an SS class airship, which was later joined by airships SS22, SS24 and SS25. The airships, which could drop bombs, escorted ships and patrolled for enemy submarines in the central section of the Irish Sea between Bardsey Island, Dublin, the Isle of Man and Morecambe Bay. This area includes the approaches to the Port of Liverpool, then one of the busiest ports in the world.

In June 1917 three SSP class airships, SSP1, SSP5 and SSP6, replaced two of the original SS class airships, the other two old airships continued in use. The airships were later replaced by eight SSZ class airships, which had greater speed, endurance and bomb load.

The airships communicated by radio with a relay station at Llaneilian on the north coast of Anglesey, whose operators contacted the airship station by telephone.

In November 1917 an unsuccessful attempt was made to base Airco DH.4 light bomber biplanes at RNAS Anglesey. From August to November 1918, eight Airco DH.6 biplanes of No. 255 Squadron RAF were based at RNAS Anglesey, but the poorly-drained land caused difficulty, and the aircraft were transferred to the newly opened Bangor Aerodrome on the mainland.

There were plans to base airships at Malahide from 1919, but the plans were abandoned at the end of the war.

Experimental work conducted at RNAS Anglesey during the First World War included the use of hydrophones suspended under airships to detect submarines, the use of phosphorus to create smoke screens at sea, and the use of hydrogen from the airship envelope to fuel the engine.

At the end of the First World War, Major Thomas Elmhirst, the commanding officer of the station, celebrated the armistice by successfully piloting an SSZ airship under the Menai Suspension Bridge. The act did not harm Elmhirst's career, and he later became Air Marshal Sir Thomas Walker Elmhirst, a senior commander of the RAF.

In 1920 the site was bought by Anglesey County Council. The aircraft shed was demolished and some of the buildings were used as an isolation hospital.

Second World War

In 1941 the site was requisitioned for use as an airfield, and the hospital was transferred to Llangefni. In 1942 three tee hangars and seventeen blister hangars were constructed, and concrete runways were laid in 1943. At this time the base was controlled by RAF Flying Training Command. The RAF base was initially named RAF Heneglwys (a nearby hamlet) but was soon renamed RAF Mona (Latin for Anglesey).

The base was intended to be used by No. 6 Air Gunnery School (AGS), but this unit was not established and RAF Mona was instead used by 3 AGS, which transferred from RAF Castle Kennedy in south-west Scotland in December 1942. 3 AGS was initially equipped with 48 Blackburn Botha torpedo bombers, 6 Fairey Battle light bombers and 8 Miles Martinet target tug aircraft. These were subsequently replaced by Avro Anson multi-role aircraft. in October 1943, 3 AGS returned to RAF Castle Kennedy.

In spring 1943 RAF Mona was used by No. 5 (Pilots) Advanced Flying Unit to train Turkish officers, using Miles Master aircraft. From November 1943 until June 1945, No. 8 Observers Advanced Flying Unit were based at RAF Mona, equipped with Avro Ansons. At the end of the Second World War, 1,378 officers and men of the RAF and 408 officers and women of the WAAF were based at RAF Mona. The airfield was placed on care and maintenance at the end of the war.

After 1945
RAF Mona reopened in 1951 as a relief landing ground for RAF Valley, then used by No. 202 Advanced Flying School operating de Havilland Vampire jet fighters. RAF Mona still has this role.

Today, Mona is used for circuit practice by BAE Hawks from RAF Valley along with a civilian flying club and 2474 (Cefni) Squadron Air Training Corps.

RAF units
The following units were based at RAF Mona:
 No. 3 Air Gunners School RAF
 No. 4 Flying Training School RAF
 No. 5 (Pilots) Advanced Flying Unit RAF
 No. 7 Flying Training School RAF
 No. 8 (Observers) Advanced Flying Unit RAF
 No. 63 Gliding School RAF
 No. 202 Advanced Flying School RAF
 No. 255 Squadron RAF
 No. 251 (Special Duty) Flight
 No. 522 (Special Duty) Flight
 No. 577 Squadron RAF
 No. 1606 (Anti-Aircraft Co-operation) Flight RAF

Accidents and incidents 
A Hawk aircraft crashed at RAF Mona in 2007. The pilot ejected safely and made a full recovery.

A Hawk aircraft overshot the runway on 13 September 2013. The aircraft was practising forced landings when it hit a goose while on the runway and ended up in the arresting safety net. Both instructor and pupil were unhurt.

In June 2016 a man was convicted of endangering aircraft by shining a powerful torch at pilots undertaking night-time fast jet training at RAF Mona.

See also 

 List of Royal Air Force stations
 List of air stations of the Royal Navy

References

Bibliography

External links 

 Mona Flying Club
 UK Military Aeronautical Information Publication – Mona (EGOQ)

Buildings and structures in Anglesey
Royal Air Force stations in Wales
Royal Air Force stations of World War II in the United Kingdom
Royal Naval Air Stations in Wales